Alto Alegre is a city in the Brazilian state of Roraima. The population in 2020 was 15,380, and the area is 25,567 km².
Its limits are Amajari to the north, Boa Vista in the east, Mucajaí and Iracema in the south, and Venezuela in the west.

Alto Alegre was founded by Pedro Costa, a gold miner. In 1982, it became an independent municipality. It can be accessed from the RR-205 highway from Boa Vista.

The municipality contains part of the Roraima National Forest.

References

External links
 Official website (in Portuguese)
 

Municipalities in Roraima